AD 72 (LXXII) was a leap year starting on Wednesday (link will display the full calendar) of the Julian calendar. At the time, it was known as the Year of the Consulship of Vespasian and Titus (or, less frequently, year 825 Ab urbe condita). The denomination AD 72 for this year has been used since the early medieval period, when the Anno Domini calendar era became the prevalent method in Europe for naming years.

Events

By place

Roman Empire 
 Antiochus IV of Syria is deposed by Emperor Vespasian.
 Vespasian and Titus are Roman Consuls.
 First Jewish-Roman War: The Roman army (Legio X Fretensis) under Sextus Lucilius Bassus lays siege to the Jewish garrison of Machaerus at the Dead Sea. After they capitulate, the Zealots are allowed to leave the fortress before it is destroyed. 
 The Romans lay siege to Masada, a desert fortress held by the Sicarii.
 Flavia Neapolis (Nablus) is founded.
 Vespasian starts the building of the Colosseum; the amphitheatre is used for gladiatorial games and public spectacles, such as sea battles, re-enactments of famous battles, and dramas of Classical mythology.

Births 
 Julia Balbilla, princess of Commagene

Deaths 
 July 3 – Thomas the Apostle, Christian preacher and martyr (according to Roman Catholic tradition)

References 

0072

als:70er#Johr 72